Samir Okasha , is a Professor of Philosophy of Science at University of Bristol. He is a winner of Lakatos Award for his book Evolution and the Levels of Selection. He was appointed a Fellow of the British Academy in 2018.

Books
 Philosophy of Biology (OUP 2019)
 Agents and Goals in Evolution (OUP 2018)
 Evolution and the Levels of Selection (OUP 2006)
 Philosophy of Science: A Very Short Introduction (OUP 2002; second edition 2015)

References

Living people
Historians of science
Philosophers of science
Academics of the University of Bristol
Alumni of Balliol College, Oxford
Lakatos Award winners
Fellows of the British Academy
Year of birth missing (living people)
English people of Egyptian descent